The forest horseshoe bat (Rhinolophus silvestris) is a species of bat in the family Rhinolophidae. It is found in the Republic of the Congo and Gabon. Its natural habitats are subtropical or tropical moist lowland forest and caves.

References

Rhinolophidae
Mammals described in 1959
Taxonomy articles created by Polbot
Bats of Africa
Western Congolian forest–savanna mosaic